Calvin Leon Natt (born January 8, 1957) is an American retired professional basketball player.  A 6'6" (1.98 m) forward, Natt played at Northeast Louisiana University under coach Lenny Fant. After college, he played 11 NBA seasons (1979–1990), spending time with the New Jersey Nets, Portland Trail Blazers, Denver Nuggets, San Antonio Spurs, and Indiana Pacers.  He represented the Nuggets in the 1985 NBA All-Star Game, and retired with 10,291 career points. He is the older brother of former NBA player Kenny Natt.  Natt's nickname was "Pit Bull".

Calvin Natt later became an ordained minister. He owns a funeral home in Denver, Colorado.

NBA career statistics

Regular season 

|-
| style="text-align:left;"| 
| style="text-align:left;"|New Jersey
| 53 ||  || 38.6 || .479 || .200 || .711 || 9.7 || 2.1 || 1.5 || .4 || 19.7
|-
| style="text-align:left;"| 
| style="text-align:left;"|Portland
| 25 ||  || 32.4 || .480 || .500 || .770 || 7.1 || 2.3 || 1.0 || .5 || 20.4
|-
| style="text-align:left;"| 
| style="text-align:left;"|Portland
| 74 ||  || 28.5 || .497 || .500 || .707 || 5.8 || 2.1 || 1.0 || .2 || 13.4
|-
| style="text-align:left;"| 
| style="text-align:left;"|Portland
| 75 || 71 || 34.7 || .576 || .250 || .750 || 8.2 || 2.0 || .8 || .5 || 17.7
|-
| style="text-align:left;"| 
| style="text-align:left;"|Portland
| 80 || 80 || 36.0 || .543 || .150 || .792 || 7.5 || 2.1 || .8 || .4 || 20.4
|-
| style="text-align:left;"| 
| style="text-align:left;"|Portland
| 79 || 74 || 33.4 || .583 || .118 || .797 || 6.0 || 2.3 || .9 || .3 || 16.2
|-
| style="text-align:left;"| 
| style="text-align:left;"|Denver
| 78 || 76 || 34.1 || .546 || .000 || .793 || 7.8 || 3.1 || 1.0 || .4 || 23.3
|-
| style="text-align:left;"| 
| style="text-align:left;"|Denver
| 69 || 62 || 29.1 || .504 || .333 || .801 || 6.3 || 2.4 || .8 || .2 || 17.7
|-
| style="text-align:left;"| 
| style="text-align:left;"|Denver
| 1 || 1 || 20.0 || .400 || – || 1.000 || 5.0 || 2.0 || 1.0 || .0 || 10.0
|-
| style="text-align:left;"| 
| style="text-align:left;"|Denver
| 27 || 7 || 19.7 || .490 || .000 || .740 || 3.6 || 1.7 || .5 || .1 || 9.6
|-
| style="text-align:left;"| 
| style="text-align:left;"|Denver
| 14 || 0 || 12.0 || .440 || .000 || .710 || 3.3 || .5 || .4 || .1 || 4.7
|-
| style="text-align:left;"| 
| style="text-align:left;"|San Antonio
| 10 || 0 || 18.5 || .379 || – || .729 || 3.2 || 1.1 || .2 || .2 || 8.5
|-
| style="text-align:left;"| 
| style="text-align:left;"|Indiana
| 14 || 0 || 11.7 || .645 || – || .773 || 2.5 || .6 || .1 || .0 || 4.1
|- class="sortbottom"
| style="text-align:center;" colspan="2"| Career
| 599 || 371 || 31.4 || .528 || .219 || .768 || 6.8 || 2.2 || .9 || .3 || 17.2
|- class="sortbottom"
| style="text-align:center;" colspan="2"| All-Star
| 1 || 0 || 11.0 || .333 || – || .500 || 3.0 || 1.0 || – || – || 3.0

Playoffs 

|-
|style="text-align:left;"|1980
|style="text-align:left;”|Portland
|3||–||41.7||.438||.000||.600||8.0||.7||.7||.3||16.0
|-
|style="text-align:left;"|1981
|style="text-align:left;”|Portland
|3||–||31.7||.452||–||.500||6.7||.3||.3||.3||10.7
|-
|style="text-align:left;"|1983
|style="text-align:left;”|Portland
|7||–||39.1||.490||.500||.646||9.1||1.6||1.1||.1||18.9
|-
|style="text-align:left;"|1984
|style="text-align:left;”|Portland
|5||–||39.0||.514||.000||.694||7.6||1.8||1.2||.2||19.8
|-
|style="text-align:left;"|1985
|style="text-align:left;”|Denver
|15||15||33.9||.550||–||.809||6.6||3.8||.5||.3||22.3
|-
|style="text-align:left;"|1986
|style="text-align:left;”|Denver
|10||6||29.3||.465||.500||.780||7.9||2.8||.2||.3||17.9
|-
|style="text-align:left;"|1990
|style="text-align:left;”|Indiana
|2||0||7.0||.333||–||–||1.0||.5||.0||.0||1.0
|- class="sortbottom"
| style="text-align:center;" colspan="2"| Career
| 45 || 21 || 33.4 || .503 || .222 || .736 || 7.2 || 2.4 || .6 || .3 || 18.4

See also
List of NCAA Division I men's basketball players with 30 or more rebounds in a game
List of NCAA Division I men's basketball players with 2,000 points and 1,000 rebounds

References

External links

1957 births
Living people
20th-century African-American sportspeople
21st-century African-American people
African-American basketball players
All-American college men's basketball players
American Christian clergy
American men's basketball players
Basketball players from Louisiana
Denver Nuggets players
Indiana Pacers players
Louisiana–Monroe Warhawks men's basketball players
National Basketball Association All-Stars
New Jersey Nets draft picks
New Jersey Nets players
People from Bastrop, Louisiana
Portland Trail Blazers players
San Antonio Spurs players
Small forwards